Lethe  dura,   the  scarce lilacfork, is a species of Satyrinae butterfly found in the  Indomalayan realm.

Subspecies
      L. d. dura   Himalays, West China, Formosa Assam, Burma, ThailandL. d. gammiei    (Moore, [1892])   Northwest India, Bhutan, SikkimL. d. mansonia    Fruhstorfer, 1911   Indo China, VietnamL. d. moupiniensis    (Poujade, 1884)   West ChinaL. d. neoclides''    Fruhstorfer, 1909    Taiwan

References

dura
Butterflies of Asia